Linluo railway station is a railway station located in Linluo Township, Pingtung County, Taiwan. It is located on the Pingtung line and is operated by Taiwan Railways.

References

1941 establishments in Taiwan
Railway stations opened in 1941
Railway stations in Pingtung County
Railway stations served by Taiwan Railways Administration